Madoc, Ontario may refer to:
 Madoc, Ontario (township), a township (a type of municipality) located in Hastings County, Ontario
 Madoc, Ontario (village), a community located in the Township of Centre Hastings, Hastings County, Ontario